John A. Conant was a member of the Wisconsin State Senate.

Biography
Conant was born on August 7, 1887. He graduated from high school in Eagle River, Wisconsin, and from the University of Minnesota.

Career
Conant was elected to the Senate in 1918. He had been District Attorney of Marquette County, Wisconsin, since 1915. Conant resigned from that position in 1919 to take his Senate seat. He was a Republican.

References

People from Vilas County, Wisconsin
People from Marquette County, Wisconsin
Republican Party Wisconsin state senators
District attorneys in Wisconsin
University of Minnesota alumni
1887 births
Year of death missing
Place of birth missing